The Electoral district of George Town was a single-member electoral district of the Tasmanian House of Assembly. It was centred on the town of George Town in Tasmania's Tamar Valley region north of Launceston.

The seat was created ahead of the Assembly's first election held in 1856, and was abolished when the Tasmanian parliament adopted the Hare-Clark electoral model in 1909.

Members for George Town

References
 
 
 Parliament of Tasmania (2006). The Parliament of Tasmania from 1956

George Town